Christina Lindström (born 18 October 1945) is a Finnish former tennis player.

Lindström won a total of 19 national championships, across singles and doubles. She featured in the main draw for the 1968 French Open and represented Finland in a Federation Cup tie that year against the Netherlands. Her younger sister, Birgitta, was her Federation Cup teammate.

References

External links
 
 

1945 births
Living people
Finnish female tennis players
20th-century Finnish women
21st-century Finnish women